Babrak Khan (Pahsto: ببرک خان ځدراڼ; died ) was a Zadran chieftain who was the father of Said Akbar Babrak (assassin of the first Prime Minister of Pakistan, Liaqat Ali Khan) and of Mazrak Zadran (a rebel leader during the Afghan tribal revolts of 1944–1947).

Biography

Early life 
Babrak Khan born in Almara. He was the son of Mazar Khan (Pashto: مزرک  خان). Babrak spent most of his early life in poverty.

Chieftain 

In 1898, Babrak had under him five companies of Zadran Khasadars, whom he maintained on a contract system with emir Abdur Rahman Khan, but these were subsequently disbanded and their place taken by regular troops. According to Ludwig Adamec, he took part in quelling the Khost rebellion of 1912, even though the Zadran tribe (which he was supposedly chief of) was fighting against the Afghan government, according to the Britannica Year book 1913. Zadrans burnt his tower in 1913. In 1917, he headed a deputation of leading Zadran Maliks which visited the Nazim of Khost with a view to making peace with the British. He also tried to restrain Zadrans from troubling the Tochi border.
In March 1919, Babrak left for Kabul with Sayyid Musa Shah Mandozai to offer allegiance to Amanullah Khan. In May, he despatched messengers to Miranshah and Sherani to summon Maliks. During the Third Anglo-Afghan War, he accompanied the Afghan Army as far as Matun and was said to have participated in Nadir Khan's attack on Thal. For his efforts in the war, he was promoted to honorary Brigadier and Naib Salar.

Death and succession 
Sources disagree on the circumstances surrounding Babrak's death. In March 1924, a rebellion broke out in Khost, and the Zadran tribe was among the tribes opposing the Afghan government, according to A Guide to Intra-state Wars. Ludwig Adamec and David B. Edwards agree that Babrak died fighting in the Khost rebellion, but disagree about which year - Edwards places it in 1924, and Adamec places it in 1925. Adamec and Edwards both state that Babrak fought for the Afghan government, against what would be his own tribe according to A Guide to Intra-state Wars. However, George Fetherling states that Babrak did lead the Zadran revolt, and died fighting against the Afghan government, upon which he was succeeded by his son, Mazrak Zadran. Rhea Talley Stewart appears to contradict claims that Babrak led the Zadran tribe during the Khost rebellion, stating that the Zadran were led by Burland Khan at this time.

Family

References 

19th-century Afghan military personnel
20th-century Afghan military personnel
1925 deaths
Afghan chiefs